Rassco (officially Givat Havradim - "Rose Hill") is a neighborhood in central Jerusalem, built by the Rassco housing company. Rassco is located between Rehavia and Katamon.

Young families moving into the neighborhood have planted a communal garden as part of a wider initiative in Jerusalem to cultivate interest in nature and environmental protection.

References

Neighbourhoods of Jerusalem